Unsung Heroes is the fifth studio album by the Dixie Dregs, released in 1981. This was the band's first album released under the moniker The Dregs. It also received a Grammy nomination for Best Rock Instrumental Performance.

Track listing
All tracks are written by Steve Morse.

Personnel
 Steve Morse – acoustic and electric guitars
 Andy West – fretted and fretless bass
 Allen Sloan – electric and acoustic 5 string violin
 Rod Morgenstein – drums and percussion
 T Lavitz – acoustic and electric piano, organ, synthesizer, clavinet, saxophone

References

1981 albums
Dixie Dregs albums
Arista Records albums